Piet may refer to:

People
Piet (given name), a common name in the Netherlands and South Africa
Henri Piet (1888–1915), French lightweight boxer
Tony Piet (1906–1981), American Major League Baseball player

Schools
Purushottam Institute of Engineering and Technology, Rourkela, Orissa, India
Priydarshini Institute of Engineering and Technology, Nagpur, Maharashtra, India
Pakistan Institute of Engineering and Technology, Multan, Punjab, Pakistan

Other uses
Piet (programming language)
Piet (horse), American thoroughbred racehorse